Solatopupa similis is a species of gastropods belonging to the family Chondrinidae.

The species is found in Central and Southern Europe.

References

Chondrinidae